Freistadt Airport is a private use airport located  west of Freistadt, Oberösterreich, Austria.

See also
List of airports in Austria

References

External links 
 Airport record for Freistadt Airport at Landings.com

Airports in Austria
Upper Austria